Thioalkalibacter is a faculatively alkaliphilic and halophilic genus of bacteria from the family of Thioalkalibacteraceae with one known species (Thioalkalibacter halophilus).

References

Thioalkalibacteraceae
Bacteria genera
Monotypic bacteria genera
Taxa described in 2009